Scorpaenopsis gilchristi, Gilchrist's scorpionfish, is a species of venomous marine ray-finned fish belonging to the family Scorpaenidae, the scorpionfishes. This species is found in the Western Indian Ocean.

Etymology
The fish is named in honor of John Dow Fisher Gilchrist (1866-1926), as the describer considered him the “father of South African ichthyology and the pioneer investigator of the rich resources of our seas”

Size

References

gilchristi
Taxa named by J. L. B. Smith
Fish described in 1957